To See Ourselves was a Canadian drama anthology television series which originally aired on CBC Television from 1971 to 1973.

Premise
The film drama series was a successor to Theatre Canada (1970). Episodes consisted of new works and adaptations of short stories. Writing was provided by both emerging and established Canadian writers such as Bryan Barney, Shirley Faessler (Can I Count You In?), David French, Stephen Leacock, W. O. Mitchell, Alice Munro, Thomas Raddall, Mordecai Richler (Mortimer Griffin and Shalinsky And How They Settled The Jewish Question), Sinclair Ross (The Painted Door), and D. O. Spettigue (Pity The Poor Piper).

Directors included René Bonnière, Don Owen, Peter Carter, Allan King (Mortimer Griffin and Shalinsky And How They Settled The Jewish Question), Paul Lynch (The Painted Door) and Grahame Woods.

Scheduling

This half-hour series was broadcast as follows (times in Eastern):

Rebroadcasts were aired on various occasions from May 1974 until September 1975.

References

External links

 

CBC Television original programming
1971 Canadian television series debuts
1973 Canadian television series endings
1970s Canadian drama television series